Shannon Settlemyre (born June 4, 1979, in New Hanover County, North Carolina) is an American voice actress and ADR voice director best known for providing the English voice of Lum in the Urusei Yatsura movies except movie 2. She mainly works at Coastal Studios and Swirl Films.

Filmography

Anime
 Growing Up With Hello Kitty - Hello Kitty
 Urusei Yatsura film series - Lum, Ten
 Clamp School Detectives  - Akira Ijunn
 Loveless - Yuiko Hawatari, Youji

Films
 Agent F.O.X. - Agent Fox, Longtail, Tily
 Pet Pals: Marco Polo's Code - Holly, Additional Voices

Production credits

Voice director
 Loveless
 Urusei Yatsura film series
 Pet Pals: Marco Polo's Code
 Agent F.O.X.

References

External links
 
 
 

1979 births
American voice actresses
Living people
American voice directors
People from New Hanover County, North Carolina
21st-century American women